Jan Deberitz (16 May 1950 – 8 June 2014) was a Norwegian novelist.

He was a graduate from teachers' college, having previously interrupted his education at the Royal Norwegian Naval Academy. He made his name with the children's fantasy book Morgentåkedalen (1981) and followed with two books about Morgenkåpedyret (1996 og 2006) as well as the historical novel trilogy Jernaldertrilogien (1983–87). Deberitz lived in Greece and England in addition to his native Norway. He died in June 2014.

References

1950 births
2014 deaths
Norwegian male novelists
Norwegian children's writers
Norwegian fantasy writers
Norwegian expatriates in Greece
Norwegian expatriates in the United Kingdom
20th-century Norwegian novelists
21st-century Norwegian novelists
20th-century Norwegian male writers
21st-century Norwegian male writers